Theoria: A Swedish Journal of Philosophy and Psychology is a peer-reviewed academic journal publishing research in all areas of philosophy established in 1935 by Åke Petzäll (sv). It is published quarterly by Wiley-Blackwell on behalf of Stiftelsen Theoria. The current editor-in-chief is Sven Ove Hansson. Theoria publishes articles, reviews, and shorter notes and discussions.

Editors

Notable articles 
Among the contributions to philosophy, logic, and mathematics first published in Theoria are:
 Carl Gustav Hempel, Le problème de la vérité, Theoria 3, 1937, 206–244. (Hempel's confirmation paradoxes)
 Ernst Cassirer, Was ist "Subjektivismus"?, Theoria 5, 1939, 111–140.
 Alf Ross, Imperatives and Logic, Theoria 7, 1941, 53–71. (Ross' deontic paradox)
 Georg Henrik von Wright, The Paradoxes of Confirmation, Theoria 31, 1965, 255–274.
 Per Lindström, First Order Predicate Logic with Generalized Quantifiers, Theoria 32, 1966, 186–195. (Lindström quantifiers)
 Per Lindström, On Extensions of Elementary Logic, Theoria 35, 1969, 1–11. (Lindström's theorem)
 Richard Montague, Universal Grammar, Theoria 36, 1970, 373–398. (Montague's universal grammar)
 Michael Ruse, The Revolution in Biology, Theoria 36, 1970, 1–22.
 Charles Leonard Hamblin, Mathematical models of dialogue. Theoria 37, 1971, 130–155.
 David Lewis, Are We Free to Break the Laws?, Theoria 47, 1981, 113–121.
 Carlos E. Alchourrón & David Makinson, On the Logic of Theory Change: Contraction Functions and their Associated Revision Functions, Theoria 48, 1982, 14–37.
 W.V. Quine, Assuming Objects, Theoria 60, 1994, 171–183.
 Donald Davidson, On Quine's Philosophy, Theoria 60, 1994, 184–192.
 Donald Davidson & W.V. Quine, Exchange Between Donald Davidson and W.V. Quine Following Davidson's Lecture, Theoria 60, 1994, 226–231.
 Michael Dummett, Bivalence and Vagueness, Theoria 61, 1995, 201–216.
 Lars Bergström, Reflections on Consequentialism, Theoria 62, 1996, 74–94.
 David Lewis, Rights to Rights, Theoria 69, 2003, 160–165.
 Saul Kripke, Frege's Theory of Sense and Reference: Some Exegetical Notes, Theoria 74, 2008, 181–218.

External links 
 

Philosophy journals
Publications established in 1935
Wiley-Blackwell academic journals
Quarterly journals
English-language journals